Rinjala Raherinaivo (born 25 May 1998) is a Malagasy footballer who plays as a midfielder for CNaPS Sport and the Madagascar national team.

International career
Raherinaivo made his debut for the Madagascar national team in a 6–1 defeat by DR Congo in a qualification game for the 2017 Africa Cup of Nations.

Career statistics

Club

International

Scores and results list Madagascar's goal tally first, score column indicates score after each Raherinaivo goal.

References

External links
 Profile at the official CAF website
 Profile at Atalentis Scouting

1998 births
Living people
People from Antananarivo
Malagasy footballers
Association football midfielders
Madagascar international footballers
Swiss Promotion League players
CNaPS Sport players
Malagasy expatriate footballers
Malagasy expatriate sportspeople in Switzerland
Expatriate footballers in Switzerland